Edward Robinson (27 December 1862 – 3 September 1942) was an English amateur first-class cricketer, who played one match for Yorkshire County Cricket Club in 1887, against Middlesex at Lord's.

Born in Honley, near Holmfirth, Yorkshire, England, Robinson was a right-handed batsman who scored 0 and 23 not out, as Middlesex won the match by six wickets.

Robinson died in September 1942, in Clifton, Bristol, England.

References

External links
Cricinfo Profile
Cricket Archive Statistics

1862 births
1942 deaths
Yorkshire cricketers
People from Honley
English cricketers
Cricketers from Yorkshire